Beaver National Forest was established as the Beaver Forest Reserve by the U.S. Forest Service in Utah on January 24, 1906  with . It became a National Forest on March 4, 1907. On July 1, 1908 Beaver was combined with Fillmore National Forest and the name was discontinued. The lands are presently included in Fishlake National Forest.

References

External links
Forest History Society
Forest History Society:Listing of the National Forests of the United States Text from Davis, Richard C., ed. Encyclopedia of American Forest and Conservation History. New York: Macmillan Publishing Company for the Forest History Society, 1983. Vol. II, pp. 743-788.
 

Former National Forests of Utah